The Reverend Jesse Custer is a fictional character and the protagonist of the comic book series Preacher, created by writer Garth Ennis and artist Steve Dillon (with a large percentage of the original cover art painted by Glenn Fabry), published by the Vertigo imprint of DC Comics.

He was ranked the 11th Greatest Comic Book Character by Empire. In 2011, IGN ranked Jesse Custer 34th in the Top 100 Comic Book Heroes.

Dominic Cooper portrayed the live action version of the character in the television series Preacher.

Character history

Early days
Jesse Custer was born on September 19, 1973, son of John Custer, a U.S. Marine from Texas, and Christina L'Angelle, a troubled runaway. The couple met when Christina, encouraged by the Vietnam War-protesting group she was traveling with, spat in the eye of the first soldier she saw returning from overseas. Despite the assault, the two recognized a sense of displacement in each other, and a relationship formed. Quickly, John and Christina fell deeply in love and gave birth to a son, Jesse.

During Jesse's early years, his father instilled a love of cowboys and justice in him. Their happiness was short-lived, as Christina's family finally caught up with them with the intention of bringing her home. Psychotic thugs Jody and T.C. were prepared to murder John until they realized he was the father of Christina's son and were obliged to take him along.

Jesse was taken back to the family home and introduced to his malicious, intelligent, yet decrepit Grandma, who began to teach him to both love and fear God. John and Christina were married, although John secretly vowed to escape with his family after a suitably safe period of time had passed, but they were caught during the escape attempt, and Jody killed John in front of young Jesse's eyes. After further torment from Jody, Jesse vowed never to cry again.

After that, Jesse was stuck with his new family, his only friend Billy-Bob, a one-eyed, inbred swamp-dweller. Gradually his family managed to cruelly take these from him, too. Jesse was educated largely by his mother, while the sadistic Jody taught him mechanics, fighting, and shooting. He was frequently punished by being placed in an airtight coffin and then submerged at the bottom of a river. Jesse's sanity was held intact by the company of a spirit taking the form of cowboy legend John Wayne. Whether this spirit is a genuine manifestation of the Western hero or simply a coping mechanism spawned from his movie-watching history with his father is uncertain. In either case, there's no question that Wayne held him together.

By his late teens, the death of his parents and his best friend Billy-Bob gave Jesse the necessary drive to escape the L'Angelle family and run away.

After Angelville
Jesse was a cocky young man, using his skills and good looks to get easy money. Eventually, he ran into a woman who would change his life forever: Tulip O'Hare. The two fell in love and, along with Tulip's friend Amy, pursued a life of crime, stealing expensive cars without getting caught. The three soon became indebted to a criminal who also stole horses to sell on the meat market. With the help of a former Texas Ranger, Jesse and Tulip freed the horses and defeated the thieves, and Jesse hanged the French meat-dealer for horse-rustling and murdering the ranger, whom Jesse had grown to like and respect (as seen in "Preacher: Tall in the Saddle").

Jesse and Tulip enjoyed a high life of crime and sex on the highways — Jesse planned on proposing to Tulip but the sudden reappearance of Jody and T.C. prevented that. Threatening to kill Tulip if he ever spoke to her again, Jesse simply 'disappeared' from her life and was pressed into the clergy by his Grandma. Finally admitting defeat and turning to alcohol, he began practicing as reverend to an ungrateful and ignorant Texas town.

Soon enough, the John Wayne spirit that had appeared to Jesse now refused to talk to him. Jesse's desire to point out the hypocrisy of his congregations' lives was finally resolved when he chanced to encounter the comedian Bill Hicks (in either Dallas or Houston, as Jesse was a trifle too drunk to remember properly). Watching the performance of Hicks' cynical, caustic yet utterly truthful wit inspired Jesse to live to a higher standard; when he heard of Hicks' death, he decided to confront his congregation in the local bar, where he pointed out the residents' dirty little secrets. Eventually, Jesse was cut short when he accused a drunk of having raped a hitchhiker.  The rapist, whose father had paid off the judge, beat Jesse unconscious with a pool cue.

Finding God

Genesis
During a sermon the day after he was attacked in the bar, Jesse was suddenly struck by a supernatural force later identified as Genesis, grafting itself to Jesse's soul and releasing an explosion of energy that destroyed the church and the town, killing the whole population. By a well-timed coincidence, Tulip had hitched a lift with an Irishman named Proinsias Cassidy after having just bungled her first job as an assassin. The two discovered Jesse among the rubble of the church and, after some discussion, agreed to help him to safety, although Tulip was still furious with Jesse over his sudden abandonment of her five years before. The death of the townsfolk and the rumored appearance of a stone-faced, dual-pistol wielding cowboy brought the involvement of both local law enforcement and the FBI.

Through subsequent bloodshed and black humor, the following is revealed:
 Merging with Genesis has given Jesse "the Word of God", a power which forces the listener to obediently follow his commands, so long as the listener can hear and comprehend what is said. This power is signified by Jesse's eyes glowing an eerie red.
 The highly charismatic Cassidy, while appearing to be human, is actually a vampire well into his 90s.
 The mysterious cowboy is the unstoppable Saint of Killers, sent on a mission from Heaven to find Jesse and subsequently Genesis.
 Genesis is the result of a sexual union between an angel and a demon, something not defined by good or evil, and perhaps more powerful than God Himself. It escaped its confinement in Heaven and fled to Earth, finding Jesse.
 When Genesis was born, God left Heaven, and no one knows where He went or why.

Much of this information was forced from an angel using Jesse's newfound power. Jesse also made a new friend in Cassidy after initially calling him an abomination for drinking blood. Jesse also discovered he was being followed by the Saint of Killers, who was sent to hunt down the mortal who had merged with Genesis.

Following these revelations, Jesse decided to use his power to track God down and make Him face up to His own wrongdoings as Creator.

Jesse's quest for God would take on the form of an unconventional road trip. He visited many American landmarks, including New York City, Texas, San Francisco, and New Orleans.

Family reunion
While on the road, he was once again captured by Jody and T.C., who had almost given up on finding him again. This time, they took Tulip with them, too. Jesse tried to use the Word of God on Jody, but it apparently had no effect on him. Jesse was returned to Grandma, who allowed him one final night with Tulip. Jesse explained to her the events of his childhood, the murder of his father at the hands of Jody, and the real reason why he had to leave her five years before. When morning came, Grandma sent in Jody, who shot Tulip in the head with his handgun. A broken man, Jesse lost all hope.

The following day, God visited Tulip's corpse and returned her to life, commanding her to persuade Jesse to give up his quest. Tulip refused, believing God to be using her resurrection as a bribe to get Jesse to end his quest. Meanwhile, John Wayne's spirit slowly convinced the devastated Jesse to fight back against his captors and finally collect on all the pain they had caused him throughout his life.

While imprisoned in his room, Jesse tried the Word on T.C. again and was grimly satisfied to see it work. Jesse beat T.C. to a bloody pulp, set fire to Grandma's clan, and battled Jody in a final showdown, eventually breaking his back, strangling him to death and reclaiming his father's Zippo lighter. Tulip shot T.C. dead, and Grandma was killed when the burning house ignited her oxygen tank, sending her rocketing into the sky like a fiery comet.

Reunited, Jesse and Tulip shared a passionate kiss, finally free from the demons of Jesse's past.

Cassidy and the Grail
While helping Cassidy track down the man responsible for giving his junkie girlfriend a large amount of heroin to stash, Jesse met The Grail, a sinister organization who have been tasked with finding and capturing Jesse. The secret society was headed by a pope-like figure named Allfather D'Aronique, and his right-hand man, The Sacred Executioner, a German military expert referred to as Herr Starr. While the All-Father wished to capture Jesse in retaliation for the death of his distant aunt (Jesse's grandmother), Starr heard of Jesse's power and planned to use him to bring on Armageddon so they could take over the world.

The Grail took Cassidy, believing him to be Jesse, and flew him to a hidden base in France named Masada, where Cassidy maintained the deception. He was found out, and the Grail repeatedly and unsuccessfully, attempted to kill him. Jesse traveled to France to recover Cassidy, believing that they share a bond. He was unwilling to endanger Tulip's life in a rescue attempt, and left her while she slept.

Jesse rescued Cassidy, but not without incurring Starr's wrath and inadvertently helping to elevate him to the level of All-Father of the Grail. The Saint of Killers was now after Jesse for information regarding his past that might be locked into Genesis' memories. Cassidy, Jesse, and Tulip were reunited again, but Tulip was angry that Jesse did not trust her to handle herself in a firefight. When Cassidy made a clumsy pass at her, she returned to Jesse's arms and began to distrust the vampire.

Jesse realized that his only chance of finding God lay in the memories of Genesis. He traveled to Monument Valley, where he hoped a hallucinogen might hold the key to unlocking them. Starr found him, and used his Grail authority to order a massive military support, eventually deploying a nuclear strike. Attempting to flee the blast in a private jet, Jesse was thrown from the plane after ordering Cassidy not to risk his life saving him.

Much to his own surprise, Jesse found himself alive and well in the desert, having miraculously survived the fall but inexplicably missing an eye. Initially, he had no memory of what happened after Cassidy dropped him, and it would not be until later that he remembered: God appeared and explained that He saved Jesse to show that He loves him and that he should abandon his quest. Jesse refused and attempted to use his power; however, God attacked him, biting out his left eye and leaving him a wreck. Before finishing the job, God fled when He detected the Saint of Killers approaching. Though physically ruined, Jesse happily realized that God was afraid of the Saint.

Betrayal and salvation
Jesse was found by a hermit in the desert, having lost his memory of his encounter with God. After recuperating for a month, Jesse set off to find Tulip and Cassidy. When he found them, he saw Cassidy embracing Tulip intimately and collapsed in shock. Believing that Tulip had made her peace and moved on, Jesse temporarily put his quest for God on the back burner and found himself in a small town named Salvation.

The town was being abused by a local meat industrialist, a diminutive man named Odin Quincannon, and his band of thugs. Jesse was quickly given the position of Sheriff. There, he met Lorie, the sister of his childhood friend, Billy-Bob. Lorie lived with a one-armed woman named Jodie, whom Jesse eventually realized was his mother, Christina, suffering from amnesia from a gunshot wound delivered by Jody years previous. With added help from his female deputy, Cindy, and a German man named Gunther, Jesse fought back at Quincannon's criminal activity, going head-to-head with corporate lawyer Miss Oatlash, an S&M (sadomasochism) fanatic who admired Adolf Hitler and secretly desired Jesse. After escaping Oatlash, Jesse confronted the tiny businessman who attempted to blow up the town during a storm, but was struck by lightning before doing so. A defeated man, Quincannon was eventually killed by Jesse in one of his meat storage rooms.

During his time in Salvation, Jesse became very close to Cindy, and the possibility of a romance blossomed between the two. However, both of them realized it would never work out, as Jesse was still in love with Tulip. This realization started Jesse on the road to forgiving Tulip, a process he began by setting out to learn what happened between her and Cassidy.

Meanwhile, Jesse's mother began a relationship with Gunther. Although Jesse was initially uncomfortable with the idea of his mother having a relationship, he came to like and respect Gunther, who supported him when Jesse needed the town's approval to go against Quincannon. Jesse believed Gunther's tale of having escaped from Germany because he was against the Nazi regime; however, with the help of one of Miss Oatlash's books on Nazi history, Jesse eventually discovered Gunther's story was a lie. When confronted, Gunther broke down and admitted that he was a fully participating SS officer. Although Gunther pleaded with Jesse to understand, believing that he was his chance for redemption, from Jesse's point of view he could not be forgiven for the acts he had committed as a Nazi. Jesse tossed him a rope and walked out, and it is later revealed that Gunther hanged himself without leaving any explanation.

Through another well-timed prompt from The Duke's spirit, Jesse realized he was going to get back on the job he set out to do, and to bring the girl he loved to meet his mother. With the help of the hallucinogens he still had from Monument Valley, Jesse recovered his lost memories of his brush with God (and with it, the revelation that God feared the Saint). Furthermore, he came to a conclusion about God's motives. These two facts combined to give Jesse a new strategy for hunting down God.

"The End of the Road"
Jesse eventually discovered that Tulip had never truly betrayed him to Cassidy, as he had kept her dependent on drugs and alcohol after she thought Jesse had died. Tulip managed to escape the vampire's control, and fled back to her old friend Amy, who delivered the startling news that Jesse was alive and well and was in fact coming to Amy's place to begin his search for Tulip. Jesse and Tulip were reunited for the second time, and Tulip finally revealed Cassidy's true nature to Jesse.

Jesse found a homeless woman who was an old acquaintance of Cassidy's and discovered the fullness of his sins, including violence against women, theft, prostitution, murder, and addiction. While disappointed in Cassidy, he was angrier that he had been tricked into thinking that he and Cassidy shared the same code of honor that he so fervently believed in.

When Cassidy showed up to reclaim Tulip, he was surprised to find Jesse alive. He grew agitated when confronted with what he'd done, and took a swing at Jesse in anger. Jesse made him leave, agreeing to meet up on a certain date to discuss their grudge.

While devising a plan to finally catch up with God and challenge Him, Jesse realized that he would be putting Tulip in danger once more. Ashamed that he still couldn't bear the risk of hurting her, he sedated her and left her in a hotel room while he took care of business, knowing this would be the final betrayal and that she would not forgive him a second time.

Jesse met with Cassidy, and they discussed his troubled past. Jesse eventually forced Cassidy to fight him, meaning to show his former friend what it feels like to be as vulnerable as all the women he had abused. The fight was one-sided, as Jesse beat Cassidy to a bloody pulp. Beaten and ashamed, Cassidy asked Jesse for help, saying that if a good man like Jesse can offer him his hand, then that's enough of a reason to believe he has to change his ways. Cassidy asked for Jesse's hand in forgiveness. When Jesse, showing signs of recognizing and being uncomfortable by the similarities, once again turned away, Cassidy accused him of not following his own code, that he wouldn't stand by his friends when they really need it ("it's not so easy... when they're stuck on the road to hell, is it?"). Jesse realized this was true and offered a hand to Cassidy – but it was partially a ruse and Cassidy knocked Jesse out, incapacitating him.

Cassidy turned to face the sun as it rose and thanked Jesse for being his friend and offering him his hand. As he died in flames, Jesse was shot by a sniper hiding on a rooftop under order from Herr Starr – who had been watching the whole fight with glee. Tulip arrived in time to kill Starr, but not to save Jesse, who had died instantly, covered in the ashes of his best friend.

Alamo
Shot down outside the Alamo, Jesse's death would not be in vain, or, as it turns out, final. Having faced down the Saint of Killers (something no one had successfully done before), he had struck a bargain with him. Jesse's death would separate him from Genesis, the only occasion that would cause God to feel safe in returning to His seat in Heaven, but God wouldn't know the Saint would be waiting with his twin Colts, guns that deliver wounds no less than fatal. When God returned to Heaven, He was shocked to find the entire angelic host slaughtered and the Saint waiting for Him. God was unable to move him, first with His holy wrath, and then with the promise of resurrecting the Saint's family. The Saint then shot and killed God, freeing the world from His corruption.

Before his confrontation with Jesse, Cassidy had visited a church and struck a deal of his own, promising God he would hand Jesse over as long as both his own life and Jesse's are spared.

Jesse, now resurrected and with his lost eye restored, sought out Tulip, who explained she cannot and will not forgive him for betraying her a second time. On the verge of parting ways forever, Jesse tracked her down on horseback and asked for her to take him back. After seeing tears in his eyes for the first time since his father's death, Tulip accepted his love for her and will to change as genuine.

The last panels show Cassidy, now human after his deal with God, watching the sunset and talking to himself, or rather out to Jesse, saying that he will try to act like a man.

Powers and abilities

Skills and upbringing
After the death of John Custer, Jesse is raised in Angelville by Christina Custer (named after the New Orleans native currently living in Atlanta), along with the corrupted influence of his grandmother and Jody.  Along with his Bible lessons, Christina also sought a more scholarly education.  After Christina was taken from him, Jesse continued to be raised by his grandmother, but his parents had already become a major influence on his personality and outlook. Jesse also learned how to fight and hunt and shoot, and became proficient in maintaining and fixing machinery, all taught by Jody. Jody's immense fighting ability obviously rubbed off on Jesse, who impressed Starr tremendously after Jesse had taken out some of his elite Grail soldiers and evaded capture in France.

His skills allow him to easily beat the superhumanly strong and fast vampire, Cassidy (at least until Cassidy sucker-punches him). Jesse explains that this is because Cassidy has never had to learn how to fight.

The Word of God

When his soul merged with the angel-demon entity Genesis, her powers were focused into what Jesse Custer would refer to as "The Word of God". When he uses the Word, his eyes turn red and his voice changes that sounds like "nails scraping against [your] soul". Although no one can resist his commands, his victims must be able to understand them. For example, animals would ignore his commands, and a group of attacking French-speaking soldiers were able to resist him. Jesse prefers to keep his Word in reserve, using it only when he has to. However, he has used the word for all sorts of situations before, from ordering a Ku Klux Klan member to 'shit himself' to calling in on a radio phone-in show and ordering the guests to tell America what is it they really want, with embarrassing results.

Genesis
Genesis first appears as "a comet with the face of an infant". After the emergence of Genesis, Jesse is told that she knows the secrets of heaven and hell. It is sometimes a conscious exchange of information, but it also appears in the form of dreams and hallucinations. His "imaginary friend" John Wayne reappears since Custer became a minister, and for the first time gives Jesse information he could not have known on his own. He would regularly reappear to give Jesse general advice and notably telling him to leave Salvation because he's just treading water. After the death of Jesse, Genesis reemerges, but now has the face of an adult as she has grown within Jesse's soul.

In other media

 Jesse Custer appears as the main character in the AMC television adaptation of the Preacher comic series, developed by Seth Rogen and Evan Goldberg with Dominic Cooper portraying the character.

References

Characters created by Garth Ennis
Comics characters introduced in 1995
DC Comics fantasy characters
DC Comics male superheroes
DC Comics martial artists
DC Comics television characters
Fictional avatars
Fictional Christians
Fictional clergy
Fictional hypnotists and indoctrinators
Fictional murderers
Fictional preachers
Fictional travelers
Male characters in television
Preacher (comics)
Television characters introduced in 2018
Vertigo Comics characters